Enemies from the Past is a 2017 South Korean television series starring Choi Yoon-young, Goo Won, Ahn Jae-mo, and Go Na-yeon. The series aired daily on MBC TV from 7:15 p.m. to 7:55 p.m. (KST) starting from November 27, 2017.

Synopsis
After her father left the family home after having an affair ten years previous, Choi Go-ya supports her family by doing part-time work. She is now looking for a full-time job. Min Ji-seok is a lawyer who specializes in divorces and is skeptical about marriage, but he meets Go-ya and gets close to her. However, they face difficulties as their families are enemies.

Cast

Main
 Choi Yoon-young as Choi Go-ya
 Gu Won as Min Ji-seok
 Ahn Jae-mo as Min Eun-seok
 Go Na-yeon as Choi Go-bong

Supporting

People around Choi Go-ya
 Han Jin-hee as Choi Tae-pyung
 Lee Bo-hee as Woo Yang-sook
 No Young-min as Choi Go-woon
 Lee Sang-ah as Choi Tae-ran
 Park Hyun-seok as Choi San-deok

People around Min Ji-seok
 Lee Young-ran as Jang Ok-ja
 Geum Bo-ra as Oh Sa-ra
 Choi Su-rin as Oh Na-ra
 Myung Ji-yeon as Jo Hae-eun
 Han Kap-soo as Han Jae-woong

Others
 Lee Sang-sook as Ha Ji-na
 Park Dong-bin as Attorney's office worker
 Seo Sung-kwang

Special appearances
 Kim Kyung-ryong
 Park Si-eun
 Lee Hyun-seung

Ratings 
 In this table,  represent the lowest ratings and  represent the highest ratings.
 NR denotes that the drama did not rank in the top 20 daily programs on that date.
 N/A denotes that the rating is not known.

Notes

References

External links
  

MBC TV television dramas
2017 South Korean television series debuts
Korean-language television shows
South Korean melodrama television series
2018 South Korean television series endings
Television series by RaemongRaein